The First Presbyterian Society Meeting House (now the Millbury Federated Church) is an historic meeting house at 20 Main Street in Millbury, Massachusetts.  The -story Greek Revival church was designed by Elias Carter and built in 1828 for a Presbyterian congregation that had been established the previous year.  The main facade has a full-height portico with four columns supporting a triangular pediment.  It is three bays wide, with long narrow round-arch windows in the side bays, and the main entrance in the center, topped by a half-round fanlight.  The interior has retained much of its original woodwork, despite renovations in 1862 in which the main hall was reoriented from west to east.

The building was listed on the National Register of Historic Places in 2010.

See also
 National Register of Historic Places listings in Worcester County, Massachusetts

References

External links
 Millbury Federated Church

Properties of religious function on the National Register of Historic Places in Massachusetts
Buildings and structures in Millbury, Massachusetts
Religious buildings and structures completed in 1828
Religion in Worcester County, Massachusetts
1828 establishments in Massachusetts
National Register of Historic Places in Worcester County, Massachusetts